Come On in This House is an album by the American musician Junior Wells. Released in 1996, it was Wells's final studio album. He supported it with a North American tour.

The album was nominated for a Grammy Award, in the "Best Traditional Blues Album" category. It won the  W. C. Handy Award for best Traditional Blues Album.

Production
The album was produced by John Snyder; it was encoded in surround-sound. The title track was written by Mel London. "Give Me One Reason" is a cover of the Tracy Chapman song. Corey Harris, Sonny Landreth, and Derek Trucks were among the slide guitarists who contributed to the album.

Critical reception

The Philadelphia Inquirer noted that the "spare arrangements show that Wells is still a sly, crafty player." The Chicago Tribune praised the "sly rendition of swamp rocker Bobby Charles' 'Why Are People Like That?'"

The Buffalo News concluded that "no one is overshadowing Wells' soulful harp, or his bluesy voice, surprisingly intact at 62 after a career spent in smoky clubs." The Rocky Mountain News determined that "the bluesman still sounds warm and supple, or edgy and anguished, as the mood requires."

AllMusic called the album "a virtual slide-guitar mini-fest and a demonstration of the timeless appeal of classic blues done well." MusicHound Blues: The Essential Album Guide deemed it "a top-notch album cut years after Wells was written off as a creative force."

Track listing

References

Junior Wells albums
1996 albums
Telarc Records albums